Brucehill is a council estate in Dumbarton, in the West Dunbartonshire area of Scotland.

References

Buildings and structures in West Dunbartonshire
Housing estates in Scotland
Dumbarton